Statistics of Primera División Uruguaya for the 2004 season.

Overview
It was contested by 18 teams, and Danubio won the championship.

League standings

Champions

Apertura

Clausura

Championship playoff
Nacional and Danubio qualified to the championship playoffs as the Apertura and Clausura winners, respectively

First Leg

Second Leg

Danubio F.C. became champions by winning the qualifier and the annual table.

Relegation group

References
Uruguay 2004 (RSSSF)

Uruguayan Primera División seasons
Uru
2004 in Uruguayan football